Gustave De Mulder (21 December 1888 – ?) was a Belgian rower. He competed at the 1920 Summer Olympics in Antwerp with the men's eight where they were eliminated in round one.

References

1888 births
Date of death missing
Belgian male rowers
Olympic rowers of Belgium
Rowers at the 1920 Summer Olympics
European Rowing Championships medalists
20th-century Belgian people